Shuang may refer to:

Given name

Cao Shuang (died 249), military general, politician and regent of the state of Cao Wei during the Three Kingdoms period
Cheng Shuang (born 1987), Chinese female aerial skier who competed at the 2010 Winter Olympics
Guo Shuang (郭爽) (born 1986), Chinese professional track cyclist
Li Shuang (artist) (李爽) (born 1957), contemporary Chinese artist
Li Shuang (field hockey) (born 1978), female Chinese field hockey player who competed at the 2004 Summer Olympics
Wang Shuang (Cao Wei) (died 228), military general of Cao Wei during the Three Kingdoms period of Chinese history
Xiong Shuang (熊霜) (died 822 BC)the 12th viscount of the state of Chu during the Western Zhou Dynasty of ancient China
Xun Shuang (荀爽) (128-190), politician and historian of the late Han Dynasty of the Chinese history
Zhang Shuang (speed skater) (born 1986), Chinese female long-track speed-skater
Zhang Shuang (ice hockey) (born 1987), Chinese female ice hockey player
Zhao Shuang (born 1990), basketball player for China women's national basketball team
Zheng Shuang (born 1991) (郑双)(born 1991), Chinese actress and singer
Zhu Shuang, Prince of Qin (朱樉) (1328–1398), son of Hongwu Emperor
Zhuge Shuang (諸葛爽) (died 886), general of the Chinese dynasty Tang Dynasty

Places
Shuang River (Chinese: 雙溪; Pe̍h-ōe-jī: Siang-khoe), a river in Taiwan